Gottlieb Jäger (28 December 1805, in Aarau – 25 April 1891) was a Swiss politician, President of the Federal Supreme Court (1860) and President of the Swiss National Council (1864/1865).

Biography 
Gottlieb Jäger was born in Aarau on December 28, 1805, the son of the district court clerk Johann Samuel Jäger. Jäger studied law in Basel, Jena and Heidelberg from 1825. In 1829 he was appointed notary public. Two years later he was admitted as an advocate. From 1832 to 1833 he acted as government secretary. He then undertook a three-year trip to America and returned to Switzerland in 1836, where he continued to work as an advocate in Brugg. In 1848 he served as a member of the Federal Constitutional Commission. From 1849 to 1856 he served as a substitute justice of the federal court, then as a part-time federal judge between 1856 and 1874, and as president of the federal court in 1860. In addition, in 1845 he led the negotiations in Lucerne for the ransom of the Freischar. Jäger is considered one of the leading jurists in Switzerland of his time.

Gottlieb Jäger, citizen of Brugg who married Sophie (born as Siebenmann) in 1837, died in Brugg on April 25, 1891, at the age of 83.

Political career 
Jäger served as mayor of Brugg from 1838 to 1858. From 1832 to 1834 and from 1837 to 1862 he was a member of the Grand Council of Aargau. He was also a member of the Constitutional Court from 1849 to 1852. In addition, he was a member of the National Council from 1848 to 1851 and from 1854 to 1866, including as president from 1864 to 1865. Jäger, who initially belonged to the radical school of thought, later became moderately liberal.

External links 
 
 

1805 births
1891 deaths
People from Aarau
Swiss Calvinist and Reformed Christians
Free Democratic Party of Switzerland politicians 
Members of the National Council (Switzerland)
Presidents of the National Council (Switzerland)
Federal Supreme Court of Switzerland judges
19th-century Swiss judges
19th-century Swiss politicians